B-Sides is a 4-song EP by American alternative rock/post-grunge music group Smile Empty Soul. The EP contains a cover of the song "Possession" by Sarah McLachlan.

The song, "Who I Am", was featured on the Spider-Man 2 soundtrack. The song, "Finding Myself", was featured on The Punisher soundtrack.

The EP is long out of print and is nearly impossible to find. It was available for purchase directly from the band via MRAfia Webstore or at any show. When ordered from MRAfia webstore, it also came with a matching t-shirt.

Track listing

Personnel 
 Sean Danielsen – vocals, guitar
 Ryan Martin – bass
 Jake Kilmer – drums on "Possession"
 Mike Booth – guitar on "Possession"
 Derek Gledhill – drums on "Who I Am" & "What's Going Through My Head Right Now"

References 

2007 EPs
Smile Empty Soul albums